Gipuzkoa is a province in northern Spain, in the northeastern part of the autonomous community of the Basque Country. It is divided into nine regions:

Bidasoa
Debabarrena
Debagoiena
Donostialdea
Goierri
Oarsoaldea
Tolosaldea
Urola Garaia
Urola Kosta
Urola Erdia

See also 
 Comarcas of Spain

Gipuzkoa
Spain geography-related lists